Himilco was a Carthaginian navigator and explorer who lived during the late 6th or early 5th century BC, a period of time where Carthage held significant sway over its neighboring regions.

Himilco is the first known explorer from the Mediterranean Sea to reach the northwestern shores of Europe. His lost account of his adventures is quoted by Roman writers. The oldest reference to Himilco's voyage is a brief mention in Natural History (2.169a) by the Roman scholar Pliny the Elder. Himilco was quoted three times by Rufius Festus Avienius, who wrote Ora Maritima, a poetical account of the geography in the 4th century AD. 

Little is known of Himilco himself. Himilco sailed north along the Atlantic coast from the Iberian Peninsula to the British Isles. He traveled to northwestern France, as well as the territory of the Oestrimini tribe living in Portugal, likely in order to trade for tin (to be used for making bronze) and other precious metals. Records of the voyages of Himilco also mention the islands of Albion and Ierne. Avienius asserts that the outward journey to the Oestriminis took the Carthaginians four months. Himilco was not (according to Avienius) the first to sail the northern Atlantic Ocean; according to Avienius, Himilco followed the trade route used by the Tartessians of southern Iberia.

Himilco described his journeys as quite harrowing, repeatedly reporting sea monsters and seaweed, likely in order to deter Greek rivals from competing on their new trade routes.   Carthaginian accounts of monsters became one source of the myths discouraging sailing in the Atlantic.

See also 
 Hanno the Navigator
 Periplus of Hanno
 Periplus
 Cassiterides

References

Citations

Bibliography

External links
 Rufus Festus Avienius ora maritima in Latin

Carthaginians
Ancient explorers
5th-century BC writers
Navigators
Explorers of Europe
Peripluses
5th-century BC Punic people
6th-century BC Punic people